Cystobranchus is a monotypic genus of annelids belonging to the family Piscicolidae. The species of this genus are found in Europe and Northern America. The World Register of Marine Species accepts one species within Cystobranchus.

References

Annelids